Kishori is a village in Mudhol, Bagalkot district, Karnataka, India. As per 2015 stats, Melligeri is the gram panchayat for the village.

According to the 2011 Census of India, the total geographical area of village was 617.26 hectares. It had a population of 635 spread over about 147 houses.

References

Villages in Bagalkot district